Santa Elena is a municipality in the province of Jaén, in the community autonomous of Andalusia, Spain. According to the 2014 census, the municipality has a population of 1001 inhabitants.

See also
La Carolina

References

External links

Municipalities in the Province of Jaén (Spain)